Ulrich Baasch (born 23 February 1890; date of death unknown) was a Russian Empire track and field athlete who competed for the Russian Empire in the 1912 Summer Olympics. In 1912 he finished 16th in the pole vault competition. He was born in Saint Petersburg.

References

External links
Sports References
list of German athletes

1890 births
Year of death unknown
Male athletes from the Russian Empire
Athletes from Saint Petersburg
Olympic competitors for the Russian Empire
Athletes (track and field) at the 1912 Summer Olympics